Andreas Neocleous Evripidi (3 July 1939 – 1 October 2021) was a Cypriot lawyer who served as member of the House of Representatives of Cyprus.

Early life
Neocleous graduated from National and Kapodistrian University of Athens Law School in 1964. He began practicing law in 1965 and has specialized in the fields of international investment and international corporate tax law. He was the founder and managing partner of Andreas Neocleous & Co LLC.

Neocleous participated in EOKA's fight for the liberation of the island, and he was arrested by the British troops and imprisoned during 1956–1959.

Career
In 1970, he was elected as a member of the Parliament of the United Party (Eniaion Party) in Cyprus and served until 1976.

In 1974, he participated in the coup d'état and was appointed as agricultural minister.

In 2017, Neocleous's law firm Andreas Neocleous & Co, among others, was found guilty of bribing a deputy attorney general of Cyprus. Shortly thereafter, the law firm changed its name to Elias Neocleous & Co LLC.

In 2019, Neocleous bought the Cyprus Mail. Criticism came when articles referring to his former law firm's conviction were removed from the website of the newspaper the day after ownership of the newspaper changed.

Personal life
Neocleous was married to Lia, and they had two children, Elias and Panayiotis, both lawyers.

He was an honorary fellow of the Center for International Legal Studies. He was the Honorary Consul of Japan in Cyprus and the honorary legal adviser of the British High Commissioner in Cyprus.

Neocleous died from COVID-19 at the General Hospital of Nicosia on 1 October 2021, aged 82.

References

1939 births
2021 deaths
20th-century Cypriot lawyers
National and Kapodistrian University of Athens alumni
Members of the House of Representatives (Cyprus)
Cypriot people of the EOKA
Law firm founders
Greek Cypriot people
People from Paphos District
Deaths from the COVID-19 pandemic in Cyprus
21st-century Cypriot lawyers